The 1922 Santa Clara Missionites football team was an American football team that represented Santa Clara University as an independent during the 1922 college football season. In their second and final season under head coach Harry G. Buckingham, the Broncos compiled a 4–4–1 record.

In December 1922, Buckingham resigned as the school's football coach. He cited "complete disagreement with the athletic management" as the reason for his resignation.

Schedule

References

Santa Clara
Santa Clara Broncos football seasons
Santa Clara Missionites football